Miedniewice  is a village in the administrative district of Gmina Wiskitki, within Żyrardów County, Masovian Voivodeship, in east-central Poland.

The village has a population of 480.

Notable residents
Zbigniew Religa (1938–2009), cardiac surgeon and politician

References

Miedniewice